Philodoria dubautiella is a moth of the family Gracillariidae. It was first described by Otto Swezey in 1913. It is endemic to the Hawaiian island of Oahu.

The larvae feed on Dubautia plantaginea. They mine the leaves of their host plant. The mine consists of a very slender corridor, situated lengthwise in the leaf and running back and forth a few times, but eventually broadening to a blotch. A purplish discoloration is produced in the leaf, forming streaks following the course of the mines. Often several mines are found in the same leaf. Full-grown larvae are 6–7 mm long and pale greenish yellow.

The pupa is about 4 mm long and pale greenish. The pupa is formed in a cocoon within the mine.

External links

Philodoria
Endemic moths of Hawaii